Year's Best Science Fiction Novels: 1954 is a 1954 anthology of science fiction novellas edited by E. F. Bleiler and T. E. Dikty.  An abridged edition was published in the UK by Grayson in 1955 under the title The Year's Best Science Fiction Novels: Second Series. The stories had originally appeared in 1953 and 1954 in the magazines Amazing Stories, Thrilling Wonder Stories, Science Stories, Galaxy Science Fiction and Space Science Fiction.

Contents

 Introduction, by Everett F. Bleiler & T. E. Dikty
 "The Enormous Room", by H. L. Gold & Robert Krepps
 "Assignment in Aldebaran", by Kendell Foster Crossen
 "The Oceans Are Wide", by Frank M. Robinson
 "The Sentimentalists", by Murray Leinster
 "Second Variety", by Philip K. Dick

Reception
P. Schuyler Miller reported that the editors' choices here were "by no means up to the very high standards of their annual short-story anthologies," although he rated the Robinson and Dick stories highly.

References

1954 anthologies
Year's Best Science Fiction Novels anthology series